The Shiloh Temple, now Shiloh Chapel, is a historic religious facility at 38 Beulah Lane in Durham, Maine.  Built in 1897, the surviving building is a small portion of a once-extensive religious enclave established by the evangelical Christian leader Frank Sandford, exhibiting a unique expression of religious and summer retreat architecture.  The building was listed on the National Register of Historic Places in 1975.

Description and history
The Shiloh Temple stands on a property overlooking the southern bank of the Androscoggin River, a few miles south of Lisbon Falls, off the north side of Shiloh Road.  The surviving portion of the temple is a four-story structure, its ground floor a raised basement of brick, and the rest a frame structure with a mansarded roof.  A seven-stage tower projects from the street-facing front, square in shape except for the crowning open circular belfry and cupola.

Frank Sandford was an ordained Baptist minister, who in 1893 left his ministry in Topsham, Maine on a quest to evangelize the world.  He attracted a large number of followers, and construction of the Temple began in 1897. The temple's property grew to include a large quadrangular complex, of which the present building is the only surviving element.  At its height, the complex had 500 rooms and space for more than 1,000 residents.   Life at the complex was strictly regulated by Sandford, who claimed to be a new Elijah, and many of his followers sold off their possessions to join his "Holy Ghost and Us" society. 

In the early 1900s Sandford took a number of his followers on a round-the-world proselytizing mission aboard the yacht Coronet. Following a misguided and undersupplied voyage to Greenland, in which six crew died of scurvy and related illnesses, he was arrested on manslaughter charges in 1911. Sandford's "Kingdom" project was ended by legal action in 1920 following the death of a Shiloh resident, and most of Shiloh's buildings were demolished in the 1950s.  Low level occupation continued, and the present Shiloh Chapel is a successor to Sandford's legacy.

A minister of the Holy Ghost and Us Society, George W. Higgins, was a victim of New England's last tarring and feathering incident in 1899.

See also
National Register of Historic Places listings in Androscoggin County, Maine

References

Churches in Androscoggin County, Maine
Properties of religious function on the National Register of Historic Places in Maine
Durham, Maine
National Register of Historic Places in Androscoggin County, Maine